Bayford is an unincorporated community in Northampton County, Virginia, United States.

References

Unincorporated communities in Virginia
Unincorporated communities in Northampton County, Virginia